Cirphula pyrrhocnemis, the Variable Cirphula, is a species of short-horned grasshopper in the family Acrididae. It is found in southeastern Australia.

References

External links

 

Catantopinae
Orthoptera of Australia
Insects described in 1861